Pacific Commons is a master-planned, mixed-use development consisting of 840 acres in Fremont, California currently in development by Catellus Development Corporation.  It sits on part of the site of what was once the Fremont Dragstrip/Baylands Raceway Park and the Sky Sailing Airport, a glider field. Given Fremont's location at the Northern tip of Silicon Valley, Catellus originally planned the development to house primarily high-tech research and development operations with a moderate amount of retail and restaurant space, a convention center, and a hotel.  Until the dot-com bubble, Cisco Systems had planned to relocate its headquarters to Pacific Commons and consolidate substantially all of its San Francisco Bay Area operations to a large campus in Pacific Commons, which would have consisted of several high-rise office buildings. With the downturn in the technology industry, however, Cisco put its plans on hold.  While it is unclear whether Cisco will ultimately relocate its headquarters to Fremont, in 2011 Cisco purchased 149 acres of vacant land in Fremont, most of it from Catellus, fueling speculation that, at some point, it will move forward with its headquarters move to Pacific Commons.

To mitigate environmental impacts caused by the massive of the project, Catellus donated hundreds of acres of land  along the southern and western boundaries of Pacific Commons to the Don Edwards San Francisco Bay National Wildlife Refuge. Further environmental mitigation involved building a causeway as a portion of Cushing Parkway over the wetlands preserve from Pacific Commons southward to Fremont Boulevard and Interstate 880 near the Fremont Marriott Hotel. Today, Pacific Commons contains more than one million square feet of research and development and industrial space, including a half-million square-foot distribution center for Office Depot.  More than one hundred acres of land slated for research and development uses remains undeveloped.

Pacific Commons Retail District
A large portion of Pacific Commons was re-entitled by the City of Fremont to retail use in early 2004, and by October of that year Catellus opened the regional shopping center. The shopping district, a hybrid regional shopping center, power center, and lifestyle center, is anchored by Costco, Lowe's Home Improvement, Kohl's Department Store, Ashley HomeStore, Target, and Nordstrom Rack, as well as several other national retailers. There are also a number of smaller anchors who are national chain stores, including DSW Shoes, Old Navy, Total Wine & More, and Five Below.  In addition, a number of restaurants and eateries operate locations at Pacific Commons, including Market Broiler, Five Guys Burgers and Fries, Panera Bread, and In-N-Out Burger.

A major expansion of the retail district opened in March 2012. The expansion is a shopping and entertainment sub-district called The Block @ Pacific Commons and includes a lifestyle center anchored by Target and a 16-screen Century Theatres multiplex.  The Block also features a promenade consisting of shops, restaurants and eateries leading from the Target store to the theater. The shop frontage along Pacific Commons Boulevard faces the sidewalks, in an attempt to resemble the appearance of a traditional small-town downtown retail area (a common feature of lifestyle centers).
  

Current anchor tenants
 Lowe's(opened 2004)
 Costco (opened 2005)
 Target (opened 2012)
 Dick's Sporting Goods (opened Fall 2014)
 Century Theatres (3,005 Seats, opened 2012)
 Kohl's (opened 2004)
 Burlington (opened 2021)
 TJ Maxx/HomeGoods (opened 2013)
 Ashley HomeStore (opened 2022)
 Nordstrom Rack (opened 2011)

Current junior anchor tenants
 Total Wine & More (opened 2016)
 DSW (opened 2004, relocated within shopping center in 2019)
 Old Navy
 ULTA Beauty (opened 2013)
 Five Below (opened 2022)

Restaurants
85C Bakery Cafe
Blaze Pizza
Buffalo Wild Wings
Cold Stone Creamery
Five Guys Burgers & Fries
Firehouse Subs
In-N-Out Burger
Jamba Juice
Krispy Kreme
Market Broiler
Panda Express
Panera Bread
The Habit Burger Grill 
The Halal Guys
Wingstop
Ohana Hawaiian BBQ

Cisco Field
In April 2006, the owner Lewis Wolff took a modified version of his so-called Ballpark Village proposal, Cisco Field, to the city of Fremont where a large  parcel of land was available just north of Mission Boulevard and south of Auto Mall Parkway off Interstate 880 in Pacific Commons. Most of the land has since been purchased by Cisco Systems. The land had been purchased in the late 1990s in anticipation of company growth by Cisco that never occurred due to the dot com bust.

It would have been the smallest stadium in Major League Baseball. The planned development was similar to the Santana Row development in nearby San Jose with the addition of the baseball park. The planned name for the park was Cisco Field as first announced by the Fremont city council after meeting with Wolff on November 8, 2006. The stadium would have been privately financed primarily from sales of the surrounding "ballpark village" residential and commercial properties to offset the cost of the stadium. The site plan proposed  of commercial space adjacent to the ballpark, and would have included a hotel, restaurant, movie theater and several parking garages of varying size. Its plans also called for 2,900 homes. More than 580 of those residences — including 12 each behind the left- and right-field bleachers — would have been sprinkled into retail space north and east of Cisco Field, a 32,000-seat stadium with an estimated $450 million price tag. 
  
The housing would have been built in phases, and designs showed that a  team-owned parcel would have provided nearly 6,000 parking spaces until the town homes were built there. The earliest the stadium would have opened was for the 2011 season.

In 2010, the deal fell through and was cancelled San Jose was being considered for the ballpark instead.

References

External links
 Pacific Commons Retail Properties LLC
 Pacific Commons on Yelp

Buildings and structures in Fremont, California
Shopping malls in the San Francisco Bay Area
Shopping malls in Alameda County, California
Tourist attractions in Fremont, California